Maria Laskarina (c. 1206 – 16 July or 24 June 1270) was a Greek Queen consort of Hungary by marriage to Béla IV of Hungary. She was the daughter of Theodore I Laskaris and Anna Komnena Angelina.

Life
She was a younger sister of Irene Lascarina, first Empress consort of John III Doukas Vatatzes. Theodore married his eldest daughter to his designated heir in 1212. Theodore was widowed in the same year and proceeded to marriages with Philippa of Armenia and Marie de Courtenay. However John was never displaced in succession.

As a younger daughter, the marriage of Maria was not intended to add a potential husband in the line of succession to the throne. Instead it secured a marital alliance with the Kingdom of Hungary.

In 1218, Maria was married to prince Béla of Hungary, and became Roman Catholic, converting from Greek Orthodoxy, her religion by birth. Bride and groom were about twelve-years-old. Her husband was the eldest son of Andrew II of Hungary and Gertrude of Merania.

Andrew II died on 26 October 1235. The crown prince succeeded him as Béla IV and Maria became queen. Béla reigned for thirty-five years and died on 3 May 1270. Maria survived him by about two months. According to the 15th-century Formulary Book of Somogyvár, she died on 23 July 1270 and was buried in the church of the Franciscans in Esztergom.

During the Mongol Invasion of Hungary, Maria and her children were sent by Béla to the Fortress of Klis, Split, along with many other Hungarian noblewomen who had been widowed by the Tatars. She supported her husband against their son Stephen during the 1260s civil wars.

Children
Maria and Béla IV of Hungary had ten children:
Saint Kunegunda of Hungary (5 March 1224 – 24 July 1292), also known as Kinga. She was married to King Boleslaus V of Poland, after his death becoming a nun and abbess; she was canonized by Pope John Paul II in 1999.
Margaret of Hungary (c. 1225 – 20 April 1242). Betrothed to William of Saint Omer.
Anna of Hungary (c. 1226 – after 1270). Married Rostislav of Slavonia.
Catherine of Hungary (c. 1229–1242). She died while fleeing with her family following the Battle of Mohi.
Elizabeth of Hungary (c. 1236 – 24 October 1271). Married Henry XIII, Duke of Bavaria.
Constance of Hungary (c. 1237 – after 1252). Married Leo I of Halych.
Blessed Yolanda of Hungary (c. 1238–1298). Married Boleslaus of Greater Poland. Later became a nun and abbess, who has been declared as a candidate for sainthood.
Stephen V of Hungary (December 1239 – 6 August 1272).
Saint Margaret of Hungary (27 January 1242 – 18 January 1271). Named after an older sister. Canonized by the Roman Catholic Church in 1943, for whom Margaret Island in Budapest is named, having been the place where a royal monastery was established by her parents for her.
Béla, Duke of Slavonia, Croatia and Dalmatia (c. 1243–1269). Married Kunigunde of Brandenburg, a daughter of Otto III, Margrave of Brandenburg. His widow married Waleran IV of Limburg.

Ancestors

References

Sources

External links

1200s births
1270 deaths
13th-century Byzantine people
13th-century Hungarian people
13th-century Byzantine women
13th-century Hungarian women
Byzantine queens consort
Converts to Roman Catholicism from Eastern Orthodoxy
Former Greek Orthodox Christians
Greek Roman Catholics
Hungarian queens consort
Maria
House of Árpád
Greek expatriates in Hungary
Daughters of Byzantine emperors
Queen mothers